Birunia Union is a union parishad under Bhaluka Upazila of Mymensingh District in the division of Mymensingh, Bangladesh.

Geography 
Birunia Union is bounded by Dhitpur, Rajai, Bharadoba, Raona, Bhaluka and Mashakhali Union.

Demographics 
According to the National Bureau of Statistics of Bangladesh census report, the number of population was 23,723 in 2011.

References 

Unions of Bhaluka Upazila